Since 1972 is the second solo album by American drummer Josh Freese. It was released on March 24, 2009 on Freese's own label, Outerscope.

Pricing plans
Inspired by the value-added packages offered by collaborator Trent Reznor for the 2008 Nine Inch Nails album The Slip, Freese implemented a value-added purchase plan for the album with various premium options. For example, people who paid $50 got a congratulatory phone call, while people who paid $20,000 got two songs recorded about them.

Track listing

Personnel
Josh Freese - all instruments and vocals (except where noted below)
Additional musicians
Warren Fitzgerald - guitar solo on "Blood On Your Knuckles"
Jason Freese - saxophone solo on "It's Fucked Up"
Stone Gossard - bass guitar on "Who Am I To Say, Really?"
Michael Landay - guitar solo on "Point Some Fingers"
Phil Parlapiano - piano and harmonica on "I Wanna Cheat On My Girlfriend"
Skerik - Fender Rhodes keyboard on "Who Am I To Say, Really?"
Lyle Workman - guitar solo on "Get Away With It"

References

2009 albums
Josh Freese albums
Glam rock albums by American artists